The Abruzzi Glacier is a glacier north of the Baltoro Kangri peak in Gilgit-Baltistan, Pakistan. The glacier joins the Baltoro Glacier (one of the largest glaciers outside the polar region) that flows northwest in the beginning and then turns westward. The glacier provides superb views of K2, the highest peak in Pakistan.

The glacier was named in honor of Prince Luigi Amedeo, Duke of the Abruzzi an Italian mountaineer and arctic explorer who led an expedition to the Karakoram mountain range in 1909, including several partial ascents of K2.

See also
Baltoro Glacier
List of glaciers

External links
 Northern Pakistan detailed placemarks in Google Earth 

Glaciers of Gilgit-Baltistan